Franz Weber may refer to:

 Franz Weber (actor) (1888–1962), German actor
 Franz Weber (footballer) (1888–?), Austrian football player
 Franz Weber (soldier) (1921–2014), German soldier
 Franz Weber (activist) (1927–2019), Swiss environmentalist and animal welfare activist
 Franz Weber (skier) (born 1956), Austrian skier